Life in Pieces is an American sitcom that aired on CBS. It was created by Justin Adler and ran from September 21, 2015 to June 27, 2019. The series chronicles the lives of three generations of the Short family as they go about their daily lives in Los Angeles County. Each episode is told as four short stories, one for each branch of the Short family. On May 12, 2018, CBS renewed the series for a fourth season, which aired from on April 18 to June 27, 2019.

During the course of the series, 79 episodes of Life in Pieces aired over four seasons, from September 21, 2015 to June 27, 2019.

Series overview

Episodes

Season 1 (2015–16)

Season 2 (2016–17)
Hunter King, who played Clementine as a recurring guest during the first season, became a regular cast member for the second season.

Season 3 (2017–18)

Season 4 (2019)

Ratings

Season 1

Season 2

Season 3

Season 4

References

Lists of American sitcom episodes